Mount Haast is a mountain summit located in the Southern Alps / Kā Tiritiri o te Moana, in the Westland District of New Zealand. The mountain was named after the German-born geologist Julius von Haast by James Mackay (1831–1912).

Description
Mount Haast is located just north off the Main Divide and is thus located in Westland District. The peaks are located at the head of the Albert Glacier (the original name of the glacier, but the lower part was renamed Fox Glacier). The first ascent, via the Marcel Col, was in February 1907 by Alex Graham and Henry Newton.

Mount Haast was named by James Mackay. Mackay named two peaks after Haast; the other Mount Haast is a hill located near Springs Junction in the Buller District.

References

Southern Alps
Haast
Three-thousanders